Norma Minkowitz  (b. 1937, New York, New York) is an American artist known for fiber art. She attended Cooper Union. In 2003 she became Fellow of the American Craft Council.  in 2009 she received the Master of the Medium Award from the James Renwick Alliance.

Her work is in the Denver Art Museum, the Metropolitan Museum of Art, the Minneapolis Institute of Art, and the Museum of Fine Arts Boston. Her piece, Goodbye, My Friend, was acquired by the Smithsonian American Art Museum as part of the Renwick Gallery's 50th Anniversary Campaign.

References

1937 births
Living people
Artists from New York City
Fellows of the American Craft Council
Cooper Union alumni
20th-century textile artists
20th-century women textile artists
20th-century American artists
20th-century American women artists
21st-century textile artists
21st-century women textile artists
21st-century American artists
21st-century American women artists